State Highway 14 (SH 14) is a state highway in the east central region of the U.S. state of Texas. The highway runs from  SH 6 south of Bremond to Interstate 45 in Richland.

Route description 
State Highway 14 begins at an intersection with SH 6 about 3 miles southwest of Bremond.  The route travels northeastward through Bremond, mainly through farmland in central Texas, passing through the western edge of Kosse and through Groesbeck.  It then passes through Mexia, intersecting SH 171 and US 84.  It reaches its northern terminus at Interstate 45 on the north side of Richland.  The entire route closely parallels the original Southern Pacific (now Union Pacific) railway lines.

History 

SH 14 was one of the original twenty six state highways proposed on June 21, 1917, known as the Dallas-Houston Highway. From 1917 the routing mostly followed present day I-45 from Dallas to Corsicana, but going through an unbuilt route through Teague to Houston. On July 17, 1917, SH 14 was rerouted south of Corsicana. From there, the highway turned southwest to Bremond, then following SH 2 to Houston. On November 21, 1917, an intercounty highway was designated from Bremond via Franklin to Bryan. The section of SH 14 south of Bremond was cancelled that day. On March 19, 1918, SH 14 was extended southeast over this intercounty highway.  The section from Bremond to Bryan was cancelled on August 21, 1923 (but would be restored as SH 255 on October 26, 1937, which would have its south end in Wheelock). In 1926, U.S. Highway 75 was overlaid on the northern half of SH 14. On April 10, 1934, SH 14 was extended north to west of Sherman, replacing SH 116. On April 9, 1935, SH 14 Spur was created to Thornton. On September 26, 1939, the portion from Dallas to Gunter was renumbered as SH 289 and the section that US 75 overlaid was cancelled. On September 26, 1967, SH 14 was extended south from FM 46 (and SH 6 before this day), to SH 6. The highway has had the same routing since.

Major intersections

References

014
Transportation in Robertson County, Texas
Transportation in Falls County, Texas
Transportation in Limestone County, Texas
Transportation in Freestone County, Texas
Transportation in Navarro County, Texas